Bellur Narayanaswamy Srikrishna (born 21 May 1941) is an Indian jurist and a retired judge of the Supreme Court of India. From 1993 to 1998, he headed the "Srikrishna Commission" that investigated causes and apportioned blame for the Bombay riots of 1992–93. He is currently the chairman of the Financial Sector Legislative Reforms Commission (FSLRC) and also works as an independent arbitrator.

Early life
Srikrishna was born in Bangalore, to B. Narayanaswamy and Sharadamma. Narayanaswamy was a lawyer in Bombay High Court. Srikrishna was brought up in Bombay (now Mumbai) and graduated with a bachelor's degree in Science from the Elphinstone College of the University of Bombay, received an LL.B. from the Government Law College, Mumbai, an LL.M. from the University of Bombay, and stood second in the university. He holds an MA in Sanskrit from the University of Mysore, a diploma in Urdu and a postgraduate diploma in Indian Aesthetics from the University of Bombay. He knows ten languages including his mother tongue Kannada.

Career
In 1967, Srikrishna entered private practice in the Bombay High Court, specialising in labour and industrial law. He was counsel for a number of large corporations. Besides appearing in the High Court, he also argued cases in the Supreme Court of India and was designated as a Senior Advocate in 1987.

Srikrishna was appointed as an additional judge of the Bombay High Court in 1990 and as a permanent judge in 1991. In 1993, he assumed charge of the Commission of Inquiry into the riots that took place in Bombay in 1992–93. The "Srikrishna Commission", as it became known, submitted its report in 1998, and generated widespread interest in India and abroad. In September 2001, Srikrishna was appointed as the Chief Justice of the Kerala High Court and on 3 October 2002, was appointed as a judge of the Supreme Court of India. On 21 May 2006, as per rules, on reaching the age of superannuation of sixty-five years, he retired from the Supreme Court.

He is leading the effort to draft new data privacy-laws for India that will regulate how tech giants from US and elsewhere will operate in the country. Srikrishna plans to navigate a "middle path" between the laissez-faire US approach and the stringent GDPR just imposed in Europe.

Mumbai Riots 1992 case
The Bombay Riots usually refers to the riots in Mumbai, in December 1992 and January 1993, in which around 900 people died. The riots were mainly due to escalations of hostilities after large scale protests (which were initially peaceful, but eventually turned violent) by Muslims in reaction to the 1992 Babri Masjid Demolition By Hindu Karsevaks in Ayodhya. Srikrishna, then a relatively junior judge of the Bombay High Court, accepted the uphill task of investigating the causes of the riots, something that many of his colleagues had turned down. For five years, until 1998, he examined victims, witnesses, and alleged perpetrators. Detractors came initially from left-secular quarters who were wary of a judge who was a devout and practising Hindu. The commission was disbanded by the Shiv Sena-led government in January 1996 and on public opposition was later reconssions of Inquiry Act. As an Inquiry is not a court of law (even if it conducts proceedings like one) and the report of an inquiry is not binding on governments, Srikrishna's recommendations cannot be directly enforced. To this date, the recommendations of the Commission have neither been accepted nor acted upon by the Government of Maharashtra.

The Sixth Central Pay commission
The Sixth central pay commission  was set up by Union Cabinet of India on 5 October 2006.Justice Srikrishna to head 6th pay panel– Rediff.com Business The commission, was headed by Srikrishna.

Report on Madras High Court Riots
Srikrishna headed a one-man commission to inquire about the 19 February 2009 Madras High Court incidents.  He submitted an interim report on 4 March 2009 with his findings to the Supreme Court of India.

He is interested in refugee law and human rights issues, and besides being a member of the International Association of Refugee Law Judges, has presented papers on the subject. He was invited by the United Nations High Commissioner for Refugees to Geneva for a seminar on New Forms of Persecution in 2000, and on the Justiciability of Economic, Social and Cultural rights to New Delhi in 2001.

His study of Indian Philosophy & Jurisprudence, has also published a number of articles on the subject, including an article on "Conflict and Harmony: The Genesis of Legal and Social Systems", which is published in the journal, History of Science and Philosophy of Science. He is on the editorial board of the Journal of the Indian Law Institute.

He is a Life Member of the National Institute of Personnel Management, is also associated with the Western Region Committee of the Employers Federation of India, the Industrial Relations Research Association (USA), and the International Bar Association (UK).

Committee for separate Telangana

A five-member committee was constituted, with Srikrishna as the chairman, on 3 February 2010. The committee submitted its report 30 December 2010. Other members of the committee were:
 Vinod Duggal – former Union Home Secretary
 Ravindar Kaur – professor at IIT Delhi
 Abusaleh Sharif – is a senior research fellow at the New Delhi Office of International Food Policy Research Institute
 Ranbir Singh - Vice-Chancellor, National Law University

Committee to study issues related to data protection
In August 2017, the Union Ministry of Electronics & Information Technology (MEITY) constituted an Expert Committee to study and identify key data protection issues and recommend methods to address them. The ten-member committee was headed by Supreme Court Judge (retired) Justice B N Srikrishna and included members from government, academia, and industries. The committee also had the mandate to propose a draft bill for data protection.

The Committee released its Report and proposed Personal Data Protection Bill 2018 (India) in July, 2018. The Draft was open for comments from the public until October 10, 2018.

Personal life
Srikrishna is a connoisseur of art, culture, drama, and classical music, in general, and Carnatic music in particular. He tries to find time to pursue what he says is his "real passion" — Indian classical music and culture. He is married to Purnima and has two daughters.Sushma and Sowmya.

Cultural activities
Mumbai has several cultural centers, and Srikrishna takes part during his free time. Srikrishna was the invited speaker, at the 2017 Golden Jubilee lecture at The Mysore association, Mumbai.

Works
 Book on riot survivors released by Srikrishna in Mumbai, 2012,
 A Heritage of Judging: The Bombay High Court through One Hundred and Fifty Years. (Co-author)
Skinning a Cat
Indian judges.
Foreword of Gujarat Files, self-published by Rana Ayyub.

References

Further reading
 Draupadi Rohera, "The sacred space of Justice Srikrishna", Sunday Times (Times of India) (16 August 1998) (discussing Justice Srikrishna's Hindu beliefs and his work with the commission).
 Mehta, Suketu. Maximum City: Bombay Lost and Found, (2004), Part I Ch. II. .

External links
 ಕರ್ನಾಟಕ ಮಲ್ಲ,೮, ಮೇ, ೨೦೧೭, ಪು.೫,'ಮನುಷ್ಯನಾದವನಿಗೆ ಜೀವನದಲ್ಲಿ ಮೌಲ್ಯಗಳು ಬೇಕು'-ನಿವೃತ್ತ ನ್ಯಾಯಮೂರ್ತಿ, ಬಿ.ಎನ್.ಶ್ರೀಕೃಷ್ಣ. ಸಂದರ್ಶನ :ವೈ.ವಿ.ಮಧುಸೂಧನ ರಾವ್ ಮತ್ತು ಕೆ.ಎಸ್.ರಾವ್
 Official Supreme Court of India Biography
 Justice B.N. Srikrishna, "Maxwell versus Mimamsa", (2004) 6 SCC (Jour) 49, available at: http://www.ebc-india.com/lawyer/articles/2004v6a5.htm (a critique of Indian and Western interpretative techniques).
 Praveen Swami, "A welter of evidence: How Thackeray and Co. figure in the Srikrishna Commission Report", 17(16) Frontline ( 5–18 August 2000), available at http://www.hinduonnet.com/fline/fl1716/17160110.htm  (examining the Justice Srikrishna Commission's indictment of Bal Thackeray and the Shiv Sena).
 AP High Court Judgement Full Notes on Sri Krishna Committee's Chapter 8 on Telangana
 Interview LegalEra Magazine

21st-century Indian judges
Kannada people
1941 births
Living people
Sririshna, B.N.
University of Mumbai alumni
Scholars from Bangalore
University of Mysore alumni
Chief Justices of the Kerala High Court
20th-century Indian judges
Justices of the Supreme Court of India